Anatoliy Mykolayovych Vitiv (22 July 1960) is a Ukrainian politician, People's Deputy of Ukraine, and a member of "Svoboda" (All-Ukrainian Union "Svoboda").

In 2012— 2014 he was a People's Deputy of Ukraine as a member of Svoboda. He was the head of the Volyn Regional Organization "Svoboda".

He is a Member of the Verkhovna Rada Committee on Transport and Communications.

Education 
From September 1975 to July 1978 he studied at the Vocational School № 8 in Stryi. Secondary technical education.

Political activity 
Chairman of the Volyn regional organization VO "Svoboda".

In October 2010, he was elected a deputy of the Volyn Regional Council in the single-mandate majority constituency № 37 (Lutsk). He was a deputy of the Volyn Regional Council from 2010 to 2012 and from 2015 to 2019. He was the leader of the Svoboda faction, a member of the Standing Committee on Parliamentary Activities, Local Self-Government, Protection of Human Rights, Legality, and Fight against Crime.

In the 2012 parliamentary elections, he was elected People's Deputy of Ukraine on the list of the All-Ukrainian Union "Freedom", № 6 on the electoral list.

Member of the Verkhovna Rada Committee on Transport and Communications.

Personal life
Married

References

1960 births
Living people
People from Lviv Oblast
Svoboda (political party) politicians
Seventh convocation members of the Verkhovna Rada